The 2007–08 Big Ten Conference men's basketball season began with practices in October, 2007 followed by the 2007–08 NCAA Division I men's basketball season in November. The conference season began in January, 2008 and concluded in March. The season marked the 103rd season of Big Ten play.

Wisconsin won the Big Ten Conference regular season championship by one game over Purdue. Indiana finished in third with Michigan State in fourth.

Indiana's D.J. White was named Big Ten Player of the Year. Purdue's Matt Painter was named Coach of the Year.

The Big Ten tournament was held from March 13–16, 2008 at Conseco Fieldhouse in Indianapolis, Indiana. Wisconsin won the tournament championship by defeating surprise championship participant No. 10-seeded Illinois. As a result of the win, Wisconsin received the conference's automatic bid to the NCAA tournament.

Four Big Ten teams (Wisconsin, Purdue, Indiana, and Michigan State) were invited to the NCAA Tournament. Two teams, Wisconsin and Michigan State, advance to the Sweet Sixteen, both losing in that round. Ohio State and Minnesota received bids to the National Invitation Tournament with Ohio State winning the tournament.

Preseason

All-Big Ten players 
The following players were chosen as preseason All-Big Ten by the media.
Shaun Pruitt, ILL, SR, C
D.J. White, IND, SR, F
Drew Neitzel, MSU, SR, G (Player of the Year)
Jamar Butler, OSU, SR, G
Geary Claxton, PSU, SR, G/F

Teams 
The following teams were selected as the top teams in the conference by the media.
 Michigan State
 Indiana
 Ohio State

Regular season

Early-season tournaments

ACC–Big Ten Challenge

Final standings

Statistical leaders

Players of the week 
Throughout the conference regular season, the Big Ten offices name a player of the week each Monday.

All-Big Ten Conference honors and awards 
Two sets of conference award winners are recognized by the Big Ten – one selected by league coaches and one selected by the media.

Postseason

Big Ten tournament

Bracket 

Source

NCAA Tournament

NIT

2008 NBA Draft 

The following Big Ten players were selected in the 2008 NBA Draft:

References